Denon DL103 is an MC (moving coil) phono cartridge made by DENON company.

The DL103 was designed for professional broadcast use in 1962 using the arms and turntables of the day. Production has continued uninterrupted since then. There are available different versions upgraded by other companies or individuals involved in DIY audio.

Technical Specification
 Stylus: 16.5 μm diamond spherical tip
 Cantilever: Aluminum
 Frequency Response: 20 ~ 45 kHz
 Output: 0.3 mV at 50 mm/s
 Output Impedance: 40 Ω
 Load Impedance: 100 Ω
 Channel Separation: Over 25 dB at 1 kHz
 Compliance: 5 x 10–6 cm/dyne (100 Hz)
 Tracking Force: 2.3 ~ 2.7g (± 0.3g)
 Weight: 8.5 grams

Despite being designed in the 1960s it is still one of the masterpieces in audio technology and can easily compete with contemporary constructions. Due to its construction, Denon DL-103 is recommended as one of the very few cartridges suitable for heavy tonearms. (like in Lenco or Garrard turntables)
As a low-output phono cartridge it requires either a step up transformer for a standard MM phono preamp, or phono preamp with built-in MC input.

External links
 DENON DL-103 review
 DENON DL-103 review on TNT Audio 
 DENON DL-103 review on Home Theater Review
 DENON History (includes reference to the DENON DL-103 
 High-End modification of a DENON DL-103
 Consumer reviews of the DENON DL-103
 Information, and photos, about the DENON DL-103 and its derivatives
 DENON DL-103 Q&A at Audio Asylum
 VinylEngine.com database entry for the Denon DL-103
 Tunable & customizable version of the DL-103 from Audio MusiKraft

Audio engineering